Daniel McLeod (29 March 1872 – 25 November 1901) was an Australian cricketer. He played two first-class cricket matches for Victoria between 1893 and 1895.

See also
 List of Victoria first-class cricketers

References

External links
 

1872 births
1901 deaths
Australian cricketers
Victoria cricketers
Cricketers from Melbourne